A  is a type of traditional Korean coronet worn by women for special occasions such as weddings. Its top is decorated with cloisonné ornaments. The upper part is vaguely hexagonal and the bottom is cylindrical. The form of the  gets narrower towards its base.

 can be used to display the wearer's social status by being adorned with accessories made from gold or silver.

History

It began to be used in that period as intermarriages between Goryeo and the Yuan Dynasty of China happened. However, the  during the Goryeo period is assumed to have been bigger and higher than the type seen in the Joseon period.

During the Joseon Dynasty, the  became smaller, with little difference in the overall shape between the top and the bottom. During the reign of King Gwanghaegun, black silk began to be used for the covering, whereas purple silk was used as the inner fabric.

See also

Crown

Headgear

References

External links

Korean headgear
Crowns (headgear)